Aringay , officially the Municipality of Aringay, is a second class municipality in the province of La Union, Philippines. According to the 2020 census, it has a population of 50,380 people.

Known in Philippine History as the birthplace of revolutionary leader Diego Silang, its economy is based primarily on agriculture, producing rice, tobacco and fruit crops as economic staples. A nascent tourism industry is centered on its beach resorts. Its ethnic population is predominantly Ilocano and Christian (Roman Catholic).

History

Aringay was known in pre-colonial times as Alingay or Alinguey and was the coastal terminus of the Aringay-Tonglo-Balatok gold trail before the gold was transported through the neighboring port-settlement of Agoo.

When Spanish colonizers arrived in the late 16th century, they found an enclave of ethnic Pangasinenses actively trading with their Ilocano and Ifugao neighbors and traders from China, Japan and Southeast Asia. In a small village now known as Samara, a settlement headed by a descendant of Lakan Dula is thriving. The presence of Spanish soldiers, administrators, and Augustinian missionaries ushered in the town's colonial era and its conversion to Roman Catholicism.

Aringay remained a part of Pangasinan province until April 18, 1854, when the Spanish fused the northern towns of that province with the southern towns of Ilocos Sur to create the new province of La Union (hence, "The Union") The municipalities of Caba and Gallano (later placed in the province of Benguet and then abolished in 1900) were later carved out of Aringay's northern borders.

The 18th and 19th centuries marked the active expansion of Ilocano territory. Scores of migrants from the Ilocos provinces pushed their way south so that by the end of the 19th century, Aringay was home to mostly Ilocano and Ilocanized Pangasinenses.

Outbreaks of rebellion rocked the town during four centuries of Spanish, American and Japanese colonization. Bloody confrontations ignited by revolutionaries such as Diego Silang and Gabriela Silang during Spanish occupation and by insurgents during the Philippine–American War and the Japanese occupation in World War II marred the bucolic villages of Aringay.

A decisive battle on Aringay River against U.S. forces crippled US forces. By 1901, the province of La Union was under American occupation.

Japanese forces attacked Aringay in December 1941 and occupied the town until their brutal withdrawal in 1945–1946, when many Aringayenos massacred the entire battalion of Japanese command in Aringay.

Possible merger with Agoo and proposed cityhood

In 2014, La Union Second District Representative Eufranio Eriguel filed House Bill 4644, which seeks to merge the municipalities of Agoo and Aringay into a component city to be known as the City of Agoo-Aringay.

Geography

Climate
The town experiences the prevailing monsoon climate of Northern Luzon, characterized by a dry season from November to April and a wet season from May to October.

Barangays
These barangays are headed by elected officials: Barangay Captain, Barangay Council, whose members are called Barangay Councilors. All are elected every three years.

Demographics

Economy

Government
Aringay, belonging to the second congressional district of the province of La Union, is governed by a mayor designated as its local chief executive and by a municipal council as its legislative body in accordance with the Local Government Code. The mayor, vice mayor, and the councilors are elected directly by the people through an election which is being held every three years.

Elected officials

Gallery

Notable personalities
Diego Silang
Gloria Díaz - Miss Philippines 1969, Miss Universe 1969
Elpidio Quirino

References

External links

 [ Philippine Standard Geographic Code]
Philippine Census Information
Local Governance Performance Management System

Municipalities of La Union
Populated places established in 1641
1641 establishments in the Spanish Empire